Iain Fraser may refer to:

Iain Fraser (ice hockey) (born 1969), NHL ice hockey player
Iain Fraser (soccer) (born 1964), former Canadian international

See also
Ian Fraser (disambiguation)